Budmouth Academy (formerly Budmouth College) is a coeducational secondary school and sixth form situated in Weymouth, Dorset, overlooking the Jurassic Coast in England. It is named after the semi-fictional town of Budmouth (based on Weymouth) in Thomas Hardy's novels.

Facilities
The school caters for over 1,500 students in the 11-18 range (school years 7-13), and is the only school in Weymouth to have a sixth form. The facilities include extensive playing fields covering , netball and tennis courts, several design studios, and a photography workshop. Also forming part of the site is the privately-owned Budmouth Community Sports Centre, which opened in 2003.

2018 OFSTED report and aftermath
In June 2018, Budmouth College - which had been rated "outstanding" in 2010 and 2013 - was deemed to be "inadequate" by Ofsted inspectors. Four months later Ofsted inspector Steve Smith was reported as saying the school had improved following the removal of its "dysfunctional governing body". In September 2019, the school became an academy, sponsored by the Aspiration Academy Trust, and was renamed Budmouth Academy. The school closed on 31 August 2019 pending its academisation.

References

External links
Budmouth Academy official website

Schools in Weymouth, Dorset
Secondary schools in Dorset
Academies in Dorset